Knight is an English surname.

Geographical distribution
The name is found in many countries. In 2014, it was ranked 88th in England and 206th in the United States.

Notable people

A
Alan Knight (disambiguation), several people
Alanna Knight (1923–2020), British writer
Albert Knight (cricketer), English professional cricketer
Albert Knight (diver) (1900–1964), British diver
Albert Knight (politician) (1817 – after 1881), merchant and political figure in Quebec
Albion Knight, Jr., American politician and Anglican bishop
Amanda Knight, makeup artist

Anne Knight (1786–1862), British-born author, social reformer and pioneer of feminism
Anne Knight (children's writer) (1792–1860), British children's writer and educationalist
 Anne Knight, pseudonym of American author Rhondi A. Vilott Salsitz
Ava Knight, American boxer
 Awsten Knight, American singer and musician, member of Waterparks

B
Barry Knight (cricketer), English cricketer
Barry Knight (footballer) (born 1945), Australian rules footballer
Barry Knight (politician) (born 1954), American politician
Barry Knight (referee) (born 1960), English football referee
Benjamin Knight (disambiguation), several people, includes Ben Knight
Beverley Knight, English R&B artist
Billy Knight (born 1952), American basketball player and executive
Billy Knight (basketball, born 1979) (1979–2018), American basketball player
Billy Knight (tennis) (born 1935), British tennis player
Bob Knight (born 1940), American NCAA basketball coach
Brevin Knight, American NBA basketball player
Brandon Knight (disambiguation), several people

C
Charles Knight (engraver), English engraver
Charles Knight (publisher) (1791–1873), English publisher and author
Charles F. Knight, American chairman of Emerson Electric
Charles Landon Knight (1867–1933), American lawyer and newspaper publisher
Charles Parsons Knight (1829–1897), English painter
Charles R. Knight, American dinosaur artist
Charles Yale Knight, American engineer and inventor of the Knight engine
Christopher Knight (disambiguation), several people
Curtis Knight, British musical artist and band leader

D
David Knight (disambiguation), several people
Dennis Knight (born 1968), American professional wrestler best known as Mideon
Dick Knight (businessman), British advertising executive
Dick Knight (golfer) (1929–1991), American golfer
Dick Knight (tennis) (born 1948), American tennis player
Donald Knight (disambiguation), several people, including Don Knight
Douglas Knight (1921–2005), American businessman, educator and author
Dusten Knight (born 1990), American baseball player

E
Cornelia Knight (1757–1837), English author
Edward Knight (disambiguation), several people
Elise Kellond-Knight (born 1990), Australian association football player
Elizabeth Knight (disambiguation), several people
Eric Knight (1897–1943), English author and the creator of the fictional collie Lassie
Esmond Knight (1906–1987), British character actor
Etheridge Knight (1931–1991), African-American poet

F
Florence Knight, British chef and columnist
Frank Knight (disambiguation), several people

G
G. Wilson Knight (1897–1985), English literary critic and academic
Gary Knight, British photographer and architect
Gary Knight (cricketer) (born 1950), Australian cricketer
Gary Knight (rugby player) (born 1951), New Zealand rugby union player and amateur wrestler
George R. Knight (born 1941), American Seventh-day Adventist historian
Gillian Knight, English opera singer
Gladys Knight, American R&B/soul singer and actress
Goodwin Knight, US politician and 31st California governor
Greg Knight, British politician and MP

H
Hilary Knight (disambiguation), several people
Holly Knight, American songwriter, vocalist and musician
Howard Allen Knight, American politician from Ohio
Howard A. Knight Jr., American country music promoter and record producer

J
Jabez C. Knight (1815–1900), 8th mayor of Providence, Rhode Island
Jack Knight (disambiguation), several people
Jak Knight (1993–2022), American actor, comedian and writer
James Knight (disambiguation), several people
Jason Knight (disambiguation), several people
Jean Knight, African-American soul/R&B/funk singer
Jerry Knight, American R&B musician
Jessie Knight (athlete) (born 1994), English athlete specialising in the 400 metres hurdles
Jessie Knight (tattoo artist) (1904–1992), first prominent woman tattoo artist in the UK
Jill Knight, British MP
Jim Knight, British politician
John Knight (disambiguation), several people
Jonathan Knight (disambiguation), several people
Jordan Knight, American pop singer
Joseph Knight (disambiguation), several people
Jules Knight, English actor and singer
Julian Knight (executive), British businessman, former chairman and CEO of climate change campaign Global Cool
Julian Knight (murderer) (born 1968), Australian mass murderer; perpetrator of the Hoddle Street massacre
Julian Knight (politician), British Conservative Party politician, Member of Parliament (MP) for Solihull since 2015

K
Katherine Knight, Australian murderer who skinned her partner and cooked his body parts
Keith Knight (cartoonist), American cartoonist and musician
Keith Knight (footballer), English footballer
Kelly Knight Craft (born 1962), United States Ambassador to the United Nations and United States Ambassador to Canada

L
Laura Knight, British artist
Leon Knight, English professional Football player
Leonard Knight (1931–2014), American builder and architect, creator of Salvation Mountain
Les U. Knight, founder of the Voluntary Human Extinction Movement
Laird A. Knight, Founder of 24-hour Mountain Bike Racing, Member Mountain Bike Hall of Fame
Lon Knight (1853-1932), American baseball player and manager

M
Madge Knight, English artist
Maggie Knight (c. 1857–1917), New Zealand actress in Australia
Marcus Knight, American NFL football player
Margaret E. Knight, American inventor of the paper-bag-making machine
Margaret K. Knight (1903–1983), British psychologist and humanist
Margaret Rose Knight (1918–2006), First Lady of North Carolina
Marguerite Knight (1920–2004), British Special Operations Executive spy during World War II
Mark Knight, Australian cartoonist
Matthew Knight, Canadian actor
Merald "Bubba" Knight, American R&B/soul singer
 Michael Knight, the protagonist from Knight Rider

N
Newton Knight, pro-Union rebel against the Confederacy in the U.S. Civil War
Nick Knight (disambiguation), several people

O 
Ora Willis Knight (1874–1913), American chemist and naturalist

P
Pedro Knight, Cuban musician and the husband of Celia Cruz
Peter Knight (disambiguation), several people
Phil Knight (musician), New Zealand musician
Phil Knight (born 1938), American businessman, co-founder and ex-CEO of Nike
Philip Knight (cricketer), English cricketer
Phillip Knight (footballer), Australian footballer

Q
Quinton Knight, American football player

R
R. J. B. Knight, British naval historian
Ray Knight, American major league baseball player
Richard Payne Knight (1750–1824), English archæologist and philologist
Robert Knight (disambiguation), several people
Roger Knight, English cricketer, administrator, and schoolmaster
Rosalind Knight (1933–2020), British actress

S
Sammy Knight, American NFL football player
Samuel Knight (disambiguation), several people
Sarah Kemble Knight (1666–1727), American preacher and traveler
Sharon Knight, American Celtic/Rock singer and front person of Pagan rock band Pandemonaeon
Shirley Knight (1936–2020), American actress
Spencer Knight, American ice hockey goaltender
Sterling Knight, American actor and singer
Steve Knight (disambiguation), several people
Suge Knight, American hip hop music industry entrepreneur

T
T. R. Knight, American actor
Ted Knight (1923–1986), American actor
Ted Knight (politician) (1933–2020), British politician who led Lambeth Council in London
Terry Knight, American rock music producer, promoter, singer, songwriter and radio personality
Thomas Knight (disambiguation), several people
Tonya Knight, American professional female body builder
Travis Knight (basketball), American NBA basketball player
Trevor Knight (born 1993), American football player
Tuesday Knight, American actress

V
Valentine Knight, 17th-century British army officer, proponent of a grid-based street layout for fire-ravaged London
Vivien Knight (1953–2009), British art historian and gallerist
Vicky Knight, English film actress

W
Wayne Knight, American actor
William Knight (martyr) (1572–1596), English Catholic martyr
William Knight (royal servant), member of the court of Henry VIII
William Angus Knight (1836–1916), British writer
William Henry Knight (1823–1863,) English portrait and genre painter
William J. Knight, American X-15 pilot and politician
Wyatt Knight, American actor
Wyndham Charles Knight KCIE (1863–1942), British general

Z
Zat Knight, English football player
Zonovan Knight (born 2001), American football player

References

English-language surnames
Surnames of English origin
Occupational surnames
English-language occupational surnames
Surnames from status names